Nicomedes Pastor Díaz y Corbelle (15 September 1811, in Viveiro, Galicia, Spain – 22 March 1863, in Madrid, Spain) was a Spanish politician, journalist and author of the Romanticism and the Rexurdimento. He contributed to the renewal of the Galician language.

As a politician, Díaz served as Minister of State in 1856, during the reign of Queen Isabella II of Spain, in a cabinet headed by Leopoldo O'Donnell, 1st Duke of Tetuan (by then Count of Lucena).

He was both a Liberal and a Catholic, belonging to the left-wing of the Moderados. In 1863, as a member of the Liberal Union, he gave a speech on the necessity of reconciling Catholicism with Liberalism.

Works
Alborada (1828) (in Galician language)
Poesías (1840)
De Villahermosa a la China (1858)
Galería de españoles célebres contemporáneos (1841-1864)

References

Sources
Biography of Nicomedes Pastor Díaz

External links

 

|-

1811 births
1863 deaths
People from Viveiro
Liberal Union (Spain) politicians
Foreign ministers of Spain
Spanish male writers
Writers from Galicia (Spain)
Members of the Royal Spanish Academy
Galician-language writers